The 2019 Selby District Council election was held on 2 May 2019 to elect members of Selby District Council in England. It was the final election to the authority before its dissolution in 2023, and subsequent subsumption into the unitary North Yorkshire Council.

The election saw the Conservative Party maintain overall control of the District Council with a reduced majority.

Background
At the previous Selby District Council election, 22 seats were won by the Conservative Party, 8 seats were won by the Labour Party, and one independent candidate, Mary McCartney, was elected in the Eggborough ward. Over the next four years, the following seat changes occurred:

 Jack Crawford, elected as a Labour Party councillor for Byram and Brotherton, died in early 2016. The resulting by-election was won by Bryn Sage of the Conservative Party.
 Donald Bain-Mackay, elected as a Conservative Party councillor for Tadcaster, resigned from the Conservatives early in 2017 in order to run as an independent candidate for North Yorkshire County Council at that year's election.
 Michael Jordan, elected as a Conservative Party councillor for Camblesforth and Carlton, defected to the Yorkshire Party in late 2017.

Results summary

Results by Ward

Appleton Roebuck and Church Fenton

Barlby Village

Brayton

Byram and Brotherton

Camblesforth and Carlton

Cawood and Wistow

Derwent

Eggborough

Escrick

Hambleton

Monk Fryston

Riccall

1 - Swing is compared to the Labour Party's performance in 2015, rather than Duggan's performance as an independent candidate that year.

Selby East

Selby West

Sherburn In Elmet

South Milford

Tadcaster

Thorpe Willoughby

Whitley

Seat changes and By-elections
In-between this election and the council's dissolution, the following seat changes took place:

 Eleanor Jordan and Michael Jordan, elected as Yorkshire Party councillors for Byram and Brotherton and Camblesforth and Carlton respectively, both defected to the Conservative Party in August 2020.
 John Cattanach, elected as a Conservative Party councillor for Cawood and Wistow, was expelled from the party in April 2022 for declaring as an independent candidate at the 2022 North Yorkshire Council election, and subsequently sat as an independent.
 Neil Reader, elected as a Conservative Party councillor for Escrick, resigned from the party in May 2022, and subsequently sat as an independent.
 David Brook, elected as a Yorkshire Party councillor for Sherburn in Elmet, defected to the Labour Party in May 2022.

Camblesforth & Carlton

Byram & Brotherton

References

2019 English local elections
2019
2010s in North Yorkshire
May 2019 events in the United Kingdom